Hainhausen is the smallest of the five villages that make up the town of Rodgau in Hesse, Germany. First documented in 1108, it was the site of the moated castle of the von Hagenhausens. The castle was destroyed during the Napoleonic wars.

Hainhausen's major claim to fame is its annual procession giving thanks to Saint Roch for deliverance from the plague in the 16th century.

Villages in Hesse